is a Japanese footballer who plays for Gainare Tottori.

Club statistics
Updated to 23 February 2020.

References

External links

Profile at Gainare Tottori

1997 births
Living people
Association football people from Kyoto Prefecture
Japanese footballers
J3 League players
Gainare Tottori players
Association football midfielders